Zootechnics is the art of managing domestic or captive animals, including handling, breeding, and keeping.

Based on: genetics, reproduction (animal husbandry), feeding and nutrition, handling, health (preventive medicine) and economics.

See also
 Agriculture science
 Zoology

References

External links

 

Animal care occupations